The 2000 season of the Liga de Fútbol Profesional Boliviano was the 43rd season of top-tier football in Bolivia.

Torneo Apertura

Torneo Clausura

Aggregate table

Play-offs

Promotion/relegation 

Real Santa Cruz remain at 1st level; Iberoamericano (farm team of Bolívar) won promotion

Copa Libertadores 

The Strongest won on points total and qualified for the Copa Libertadores 2001

Championship 

Jorge Wilstermann won 3-4 on penalties, with keeper Mauricio Soria saving four penalty kicks, and qualified for the Copa Libertadores 2001

Title

Top scorers

See also 
 Bolivia national football team 2000

References 
 RSSSF Page

Bolivian Primera División seasons
Bolivia
1football